In economics, especially in consumer theory, a Leontief utility function is a function of the form:

where:
  is the number of different goods in the economy.
  (for ) is the amount of good  in the bundle.
  (for ) is the weight of good  for the consumer.

This form of utility function was first conceptualized by Wassily Leontief.

Examples 
Leontief utility functions represent complementary goods. For example:
 Suppose  is the number of left shoes and  the number of right shoes. A consumer can only use pairs of shoes.
 In a cloud computing environment, there is a large server that runs many different tasks. Suppose a certain type of a task requires 2 CPUs, 3 gigabytes of memory and 4 gigabytes of disk-space to complete. The utility of the user is equal to the number of completed tasks. Hence, it can be represented by: .

Properties 
A consumer with a Leontief utility function has the following properties:
 The preferences are weakly monotone but not strongly monotone: having a larger quantity of a single good does not increase utility, but having a larger quantity of all goods does.
 The preferences are weakly convex, but not strictly convex: a mix of two equivalent bundles may be either equivalent to or better than the original bundles.
 The indifference curves are L-shaped and their corners are determined by the weights. E.g., for the function , the corners of the indifferent curves are at  where .
 The consumer's demand is always to get the goods in constant ratios determined by the weights, i.e. the consumer demands a bundle  where  is determined by the income: . Since the Marshallian demand function of every good is increasing in income, all goods are normal goods.

Competitive equilibrium 
Since Leontief utilities are not strictly convex, they do not satisfy the requirements of the Arrow–Debreu model for existence of a competitive equilibrium. Indeed, a Leontief economy is not guaranteed to have a competitive equilibrium. There are restricted families of Leontief economies that do have a competitive equilibrium.

There is a reduction from the problem of finding a Nash equilibrium in a bimatrix game to the problem of finding a competitive equilibrium in a Leontief economy. This has several implications:
 It is NP-hard to say whether a particular family of Leontief exchange economies, that is guaranteed to have at least one equilibrium, has more than one equilibrium.
 It is NP-hard to decide whether a Leontief economy has an equilibrium.

Moreover, the Leontief market exchange problem does not have a fully polynomial-time approximation scheme, unless PPAD ⊆ P.

On the other hand, there are algorithms for finding an approximate equilibrium for some special Leontief economies.

References 

Utility function types